Roger Eylove (fl. 1395) was a Member of Parliament for Horsham in 1395.

References

14th-century births
Year of death missing
14th-century English people
English MPs 1395
People from Horsham